Tales of the Grim Sleeper is a 2014 documentary film about the serial killer Lonnie David Franklin Jr., nicknamed the Grim Sleeper. It was produced, directed, and written by Nick Broomfield.

Reception 
The film received positive reviews from critics. On Rotten Tomatoes, it has a 100% fresh rating, based on 38 reviews, with a weighted average of 7.7/10. It was shortlisted for the 87th Academy Awards.

References

External links 

2014 documentary films
2014 films
Documentary films about serial killers
British documentary films
Films directed by Nick Broomfield
2010s English-language films
2010s British films